Frank Buchanan (December 1, 1902 – April 27, 1951) was an American educator and businessman who served as a Democratic member of the U.S. House of Representatives from Pennsylvania from 1946 to 1951.

Early life and education
Frank Buchanan was born in the Pittsburgh suburb of McKeesport, Pennsylvania.  He married future Representative Vera Daerr on January 4, 1929.  He graduated from the University of Pittsburgh in 1925 where he was a member of the Phi Gamma Delta fraternity.  

He worked as a teacher in the high schools of Homestead, Pennsylvania and McKeesport from 1924 to 1928 and 1931 to 1942.  From 1928 to 1931, he worked as an automobile dealer, and he also worked as an economic consultant from 1928 to 1946.  He served as mayor of McKeesport from 1942 to 1946.

Congress
Buchanan was elected as a Democrat to the 79th United States Congress to fill the vacancy caused by the resignation of Samuel A. Weiss.  He was re-elected to the Eightieth, Eighty-first, and Eighty-second Congresses and served until his death in Bethesda, Maryland.  In Congress, he served as Chairman of the United States House Select Committee on Lobbying Activities during the 81st Congress.

He died at Bethesda Naval Hospital on April 27, 1951.

Death and vacancy filled by wife
His wife Vera Buchanan later died while serving in Congress, and they were the first husband and wife to both die while serving in Congress.

See also
 List of United States Congress members who died in office (1950–99)

Sources

Memorial services held in the House of Representatives together with remarks presented in eulogy of Frank Buchanan, late a representative from Pennsylvania

References

Mayors of places in Pennsylvania
University of Pittsburgh alumni
1902 births
1951 deaths
Democratic Party members of the United States House of Representatives from Pennsylvania
People from McKeesport, Pennsylvania
20th-century American politicians